The 38th Vancouver International Film Festival (VIFF) took place from September 26 to October 11, 2019. The opening film was Atom Egoyan's Guest of Honour, and the closing film was Nicolas Bedos's La Belle Époque.

Awards
The festival award winners were announced on October 15.

Films

Galas
Guest of Honour — Atom Egoyan (Opening)
La Belle Époque — Nicolas Bedos (Closing)

Special Presentations
Ford v Ferrari — James Mangold
Harriet — Kasi Lemmons
A Hidden Life — Terrence Malick
Jojo Rabbit — Taika Waititi
Just Mercy — Destin Daniel Cretton
The Laundromat — Steven Soderbergh
The Lighthouse — Robert Eggers
Marriage Story — Noah Baumbach
Motherless Brooklyn — Edward Norton
Mr. Jones — Agnieszka Holland
No.7 Cherry Lane — Yonfan
Pain and Glory — Pedro Almodóvar
The Painted Bird — Václav Marhoul
Parasite — Bong Joon-ho
Portrait of a Lady on Fire — Céline Sciamma
The Song of Names — François Girard
Sorry We Missed You — Ken Loach
The Two Popes — Fernando Meirelles
Young Ahmed — Jean-Pierre and Luc Dardenne

Contemporary World Cinema
Adam — Maryam Touzani
And Then We Danced — Levan Akin
Babysplitters — Sam Friedlander
Bacurau — Kleber Mendonça Filho
Beanpole — Kantemir Balagov
Burning Cane — Phillip Youmans
Castle of Dreams — Reza Mirkarimi
Chained — Yaron Shani
Checkered Ninja — Anders Matthesen
Cherry Blossoms & Demons — Doris Dörrie
The Day After I'm Gone — Nimrod Eldar
Divine Love — Gabriel Mascaro
A Dog and His Man — Siddharth Tripathy
Dogs Don't Wear Pants — J-P Valkeapää
Fourteen — Dan Sallitt
Frankie — Ira Sachs
I Was at Home, But — Angela Schanelec
The Invisible Life of Eurídice Gusmão — Karim Aïnouz
It Must Be Heaven — Elia Suleiman
Joel — Carlos Sorín
Koko-di Koko-da — Johannes Nyholm
Lara — Jan-Ole Gerster
The Last to See Them — Sara Summa
Little Joe — Jessica Hausner
Noah Land — Cenk Ertürk
Once in Trubchevsk — Larisa Sadilova
Out of Tune — Frederikke Aspöck
Port Authority — Danielle Lessovitz
Queen of Hearts — May el-Toukhy
The Realm — Rodrigo Sorogoyen
Retrospekt — Esther Rots
Scarborough — Barnaby Southcombe
Sometimes Always Never — Carl Hunter
Song Without a Name — Melina León
Spider — Andrés Wood
Staff Only — Neus Ballús
Stitches — Miroslav Terzić
Synonyms — Nadav Lapid
Tehran: City of Love — Ali Jaberansari
Temblores — Jayro Bustamante
Those Who Remained — Barnabás Tóth
Vai — Nicole Whippy, Becs Arahanga, Amberley Jo Aumua, Matasila Freshwater, Dianna Fuemana, Mīria George, 'Ofa-ki Guttenbeil-Likiliki, Marina Alofagia McCartney
A Voluntary Year — Ulrich Köhler, Henner Winkler
The Whistlers — Corneliu Porumboiu
A White, White Day (Hvítur, Hvítur Dagur) — Hlynur Pálmason
Yuli — Icíar Bollaín

Spotlight on France
Amanda — Mikhaël Hers
By the Grace of God — François Ozon
Deerskin — Quentin Dupieux
I Lost My Body — Jérémy Clapin
Joan of Arc — Bruno Dumont
Les Misérables — Ladj Ly
Oh Mercy! — Arnaud Desplechin
The Specials — Olivier Nakache & Éric Toledano
Who You Think I Am — Safy Nebbou

Focus on Italy
Amare Amaro — Julien Paolini
Dafne — Federico Bondi
The Disappearance of My Mother — Beniamino Barrese
Dolce Fine Giornata — Jacek Borcuch
Marghe and Her Mother — Mohsen Makhmalbaf
Santiago, Italia — Nanni Moretti
Sole — Carlo Sironi

Vanguard
Bait — Mark Jenkin
Belonging — Burak Çevik
I, Wretched Man — Bastian Wilplinger
Miel-Emile — Peter van Houten
My Window — Rodrigo John
Off Season — Henning Beckhoff
One Man Dies a Million Times — Jessica Oreck
Ridge — John Skoog
Subject to Review — Theo Anthony
Vitalina Varela — Pedro Costa

Sea to Sky
Ash — Andrew Huculiak
The Body Remembers When the World Broke Open — Elle-Máijá Tailfeathers, Kathleen Hepburn
Daughter — Anthony Shim
Haida Modern — Charles Wilkinson
My Dads, My Moms and Me — Julia Ivanova
Raf — Harry Cepka
Red Snow — Marie Clements
Water Over Glass — Kellen Jackson, Zoe Kirk-Gushawaty, Amanda Thomson, Jimi Pantalon
The World Is Bright — Ying Wang

True North
The Acrobat (L'Acrobate) — Rodrigue Jean
American Woman — Semi Chellas
And the Birds Rained Down (Il pleuvait des oiseaux) — Louise Archambault
Assholes: A Theory — John Walker
A Brother's Love (La femme de mon frère) — Monia Chokri
Castle in the Ground — Joey Klein
Clifton Hill — Albert Shin
Conviction — Ariella Pahlke, Teresa MacInnes, Nance Ackerman
Cranks — Ryan McKenna
Easy Land — Sanja Zivkovic
Jordan River Anderson, the Messenger — Alanis Obomsawin
Kuessipan — Myriam Verreault
L.A. Tea Time — Sophie Bédard Marcotte
One Day in the Life of Noah Piugattuk — Zacharias Kunuk
Rustic Oracle — Sonia Boileau
Symphony in Aquamarine — Dan Popa
Three Feathers — Carla Ulrich
To Live to Sing — Johnny Ma
When We Walk — Jason DaSilva
White Lie — Yonah Lewis, Calvin Thomas

Future//Present
Anne at 13,000 Ft. — Kazik Radwanski
Danny — Aaron Zeghers, Lewis Bennett
Killer Queen — Ramin Fahrenheit
MS Slavic 7 — Sofia Bohdanowicz
Murmur — Heather Young
Tapeworm — Fabián Velasco, Miloš Mitrovič
Tito — Grace Glowicki
The Twentieth Century — Matthew Rankin

Impact
63 Up — Michael Apted
Buddha in Africa — Nicole Schafer
Coup 53 — Taghi Amirani
The Euphoria of Being — Reka Szabo
Gateways to New York — Martin Witz
The Great Green Wall — Jared P. Scott
Human Nature — Adam Bolt
The Men's Room — Petter Sommer, Jo Vemund Svendsen
Midnight Family — Luke Lorentzen
My Father and Me — Nick Broomfield
The Pollinators — Peter Nelson
The Rabbi Goes West — Amy Geller, Gerald Peary
Reason — Anand Patwardhan
Resistance Fighters — Michael Wech
Scheme Birds — Ellen Fiske, Ellinor Hallin
Sea of Shadows — Richard Ladkani
A Seat at the Table — David Nash, Simon Mark-Brown
Stieg Larsson: The Man Who Played With Fire — Henrik Georgsson
Talking About Trees — Suhaib Gasmelbari
Trust Machine: The Story of Blockchain — Alex Winter
We Are Not Princesses — Bridgette Auger, Itab Azzam
The Whale and the Raven — Miriam Leuze
Wildland — Alex Jablonski, Kahlil Hudson

Gateway
Another Child — Kim Yoon-seok
Balloon — Pema Tseden
Birthday — Lee Jong-un
Boluomi — Lau Kek-Huat, Vera Chen
The Cave — Tom Waller
Children of the Sea — Ayumu Watanabe
Dwelling in the Fuchun Mountains — Gu Xiaogang
Every Day a Good Day — Tatsushi Ōmori
Hard-Core — Nobuhiro Yamashita
Krabi, 2562 — Ben Rivers, Anocha Suwichakornpong
Lost Course — Jill Li
Lunana: A Yak in the Classroom — Pawo Choyning Dorji
Melancholic — Seiji Tanaka
No Longer Human — Mika Ninagawa
Present. Perfect. — Shengze Zhu
Samsara — Moon Jeong-yun
The Shadow Play — Lou Ye 
Spring Tide — Yang Lina
Still Human — Oliver Siu Kuen Chan
Vanishing Days — Zhu Xin
Wet Season — Anthony Chen
White Snake — Amp Wong, Zhao Ji
The Wild Goose Lake — Diao Yinan
Wild Sparrow — Shih Li

M/A/D
Architecture of Infinity — Christoph Schaub
Beyond the Visible: Hilma af Klint — Halyna Dyrschka
Cunningham — Alla Kovgan
Devil's Pie: D'Angelo — Carine Bulsma
Edo Avant-Garde — Linda Hoaglund
Eliades Ochoa: From Cuba to the World — Cynthia Biestek
Escher: Journey Into Infinity — Robin Lutz
It Was All So Wonderful: The Everyday Magic of Mary Pratt — Kenneth J. Harvey
Leonardo: The Works — Phil Grabsky
Martha: A Picture Story — Selina Miles
Neutra: Survival Through Design — Pi Letofsky
Nomad: In the Footsteps of Bruce Chatwin — Werner Herzog
Other Music — Puloma Basu, Rob Hatch-Miller
Our Time Machine — Yang Sun, S. Leo Chiang
Stuffed — Erin Derham
System K — Renaud Barret
Ursula Von Rydingsvard: Into Her Own — Daniel Traub
Varda by Agnès — Agnès Varda
What She Said: The Art of Pauline Kael — Rob Garver
Years of Construction — Heinz Emigholz

ALT
Blood Quantum — Jeff Barnaby
Boyz in the Wood — Ninian Doff
Come to Daddy — Ant Timpson
The Death of Dick Long — Daniel Scheinert
Extra Ordinary — Mike Ahern, Enda Loughman
Greener Grass — Jocelyn DeBoer, Dawn Luebbe
In the Tall Grass — Vincenzo Natali
Judy and Punch — Mirrah Foulkes
Knives and Skin — Jennifer Reeder
The Lodge — Veronika Franz and Severin Fiala
Paradise Hills — Alice Waddington

Canadian Shorts
At the Bottom of the Sea — Caroline So Jung Lee
The Beach Raiders — Tyson Breuer
Bumblebee — Adam Beck
Canaan — Wang Weibin
Chubby — Madeleine Sims-Fewer, Dusty Mancinelli
The Cut — Chloé Cinq-Mars
Days of Rage — Eli Jean Tahchi
Deady Freddy — Alicia Eisen
Delphine — Chloé Robichaud
Finding Uranus — Ivan Li
Flood — Joseph Amenta
Ghoulish Galactic Grievances — Josh Owen
Grandma's House — Sophy Romvari
Hand Job — Kara Hornland
Heart Bomb (Une bombe au cœur) — Rémi St-Michel
Highway to Heaven: A Mosaic in One Mile — Sandra Ignagni
I Am in the World as Free and Slender as a Deer on a Plain — Sofia Banzhaf
I'll End Up in Jail (Je finirai en prison) — Alexandre Dostie
In Which Life Continues Without Time — Sheridan Tamayo-Henderson
Jarvik — Émilie Mannering
Labour/Leisure — Jessica Johnson, Ryan Ermacora
Main Squeeze — Brendan Prost
My Heart Is Walking Around Outside of My Body — Matthew Taylor Blais
No Crying at the Dinner Table — Carol Nguyen
Now Is the Time — Christopher Auchter
The Physics of Sorrow — Theodore Ushev
Pick — Alicia K. Harris
Pinch — Diego Maclean
Pools — Seth Fluker
The Procession (Le Cortège) — Pascal Blanchet, Rodolphe Saint-Gelais
Shadow Trap — Damian Gillis, Michael Bourquin
Solastalgia — Millefiore Clarkes
The Spirit Keepers of Makuta'ay — Yen-Chao Lin
Standard of Care — James Rathbone
This Ink Runs Deep — Asia Youngman
Unkept — Michael P. Vidler
Venusian — Cameron Mackenzie, Suzanne Friesen
A Winter Morning — Manny Mahal

International Shorts
Amparo's Offerings — Leonel Chee
Call Connect — Indianna Bell, Josiah Allen
A Disappearance — Laura Spini, Laurence Brook
Disrepute — Stephane Mounkassa, Stefan Sundin
Diversion — Mathieu Mégemont
Family Hour — Maria Ponomarova
First Disco — Helen O'Reilly
Flush — Sheridan O'Donnell
Forgiveness — Marcello Cotugno
Grandpa — Clifford Miu
I Signed the Petition — Mahdi Fleifel
In the Shadow of the Guacari — Greg Mendez
The Interview — Ivan Sosnin
Itohime — Nao Izumi
Kill the Boy — Juan Pablo Villavicencio Borges
Lee Ann Womack's "Hollywood" — Chris Ullens
The Legend — Manon Eyriey
Liminaali & Communitas — Laura Rantanen
Long-Legged Nuria — Frank Vera Jimenez
Masmelos — Duvan Duque
Mortis — Xindi Lou
My Generation — Ludovic Houplain
Nurtured — Ben Pearce
O Holy Ghost — Mark Bradshaw
Pearl — Yuchao Feng
Romantica.com — Shay Fellner
The Sea — Cameron Richards
Song Sparrow — Farzaneh Omidvarnia
Taboo — Olivia Altavilla
Tangle — Malihe Ghloamzadeh
Tender — Anthony Lucido
Tolerance — Shaunoh
Vaca — Marta Bayarri
Way Back Home — Diego Freitas

Reel Youth
2:00 — Maxence Pupillo
AMO — Hana Huang
Better Off — Jules Brown
Body Love — Grace Larey
Bottle — Yegor Bondarenko
Eyedentity — Yoo Jung Hong
Falling Deeper — Ryan Chow
Freedom of Breath — Yasin Farrokhi
Frozen in Place — Sasha Argirov
G.P.S. Girl Positioning System — Devin Johnson
Home Sweet Home — Sarah Andrews
Human Box — Tsai Chia-Jen
Jericho — Sarah Andrews
Marlene Heavyshields (Glowing in the Dark Woman) — Jubei Quesnelle, Jayna Creighton-Fox
Qirqqut — Kadence Kikoak
Sekani Dekelth — Jacoby Macdonald
Super Grandma — Isabella Spadone
To You — Amanda Blake, Maira Gimenes, Jin Lee, Emma Watson
Tracks — Alicia Holownia, Caitlin Mungall, Jessica Lau, Joud Shawwa, Paige Ingram, Sophie McLean
u really hurt me — Callahan Bracken
Wamin (The Apple) — Katherine Nequado

Shorts screened with features
Acadiana — Guillaume Fournier, Samuel Matteau and Yannick Nolin 
Elvis: Strung Out — Mark Oliver
Forest on Fire — Reed Harkness
Happytime Social Club — David Rodden Shortt
Here and There (Aquí y allá) — Lina Rodriguez
I'm Not Next — Tristin Greyeyes
Lily — Adrienne Gruben
Memoirs — Aaron Zeghers
Names for Snow — Rebecca Thomassie
Preface to a History — Devan Scott, Will Ross
Question Period — Ann Marie Fleming
Sofia — Nikolay Michaylov
Throat Singing in Kangirsuk — Eva Kaukai, Manon Chamberland
Turns — Mariano Sosa
When the Children Left — Charlene Moore
Wildfire — Bretten Hannam

Modes
Amusement Ride — Tomonari Nishikawa
Cavalcade — Johann Lurf
L'Étoile de mer (The Starfish) — Maya Schweizer
Hard On — Joanna Rytel
Interbeing — Martina Hoogland Ivanow
Kasiterit — Riar Rizaldi
New Acid — Basim Magdy
Stay Awake, Be Ready — Pham Thien An
The Stroker - Pilvi Takala
Swatted — Ismaël Joffroy Chandoutis
Swinguerra — Barbara Wagner, Benjamin De Burca
Umbra — Florian Fischer, Johannes Krell

References

External links
Official website (from Internet Archive Wayback Machine, archived during the 2019 festival)
 VIFF 2019 Factsheet (from official site)
 Closing release including official list of award winners

2019 film festivals
2019 in British Columbia
2010s in Vancouver
2019 in Canadian cinema
2019